Wilford is a village in Nottinghamshire, England.

Wilford may also refer to:

Places
Wilford, Arizona, a ghost town in the United States
Wilford, Idaho, an unincorporated community in the United States
Wilford, a townland in County Mayo, Ireland
Wilford Hundred, a division of Suffolk, England

Oher uses
Wilford (surname), including a list of people bearing the name
Wilford Gyroplane

See also

, including people with the first name "Wilford"
Wilfred (disambiguation)